The Pap Madison Cabin is a historic site located in Rapid City, South Dakota near The Journey Museum and Learning Center, it is the oldest Euro-American building in the Black Hills area. The cabin was built in 1876 by pioneer Rufus 'Pap' Madison using cottonwood found alongside the banks of the nearby Rapid Creek. Madison lived in the house from the time of its construction until 1889 at which point he sold the plot to the founder of Rapid City, John Brennan. In 1926 Brennan donated the cabin to the City.

Description 
The cabin is a hand-hewn squared cabin featuring a gable roof covered in wooden shingles and an exterior stone chimney which was added in 1926 by the Fortnightly club. The cabin offers 225 square feet of living space. It originally had a dirt floor and was heated with a wood-burning cook stove, but the wood-burning stove has since been replaced with a fireplace. For waterproofing and heat preservation, gaps between the logs were stuffed with sticks, moss, grass, and wood chips and then sealed with mud.

Restorations 
In 1926 Alice Gossage, the owner of the local newspaper, spearheaded an effort to repair and move the cabin to Halley Park, just west of downtown Rapid City.

The Minnilusa Pioneer's Association donated local artifacts for display in the cabin, thus creating the first history museum in the Black Hills. The United States Department of the Interior's Sioux Indian Museum shared the site with the Minnilusa Pioneers.

In 2012, the cabin was lifted from its foundation and moved to a location in front of The Journey Museum.

Status on the National Register
In 2017, the cabin was removed from the National Register of Historic Places and added to the South Dakota State Register of Historic Places. The cabin, which was moved from its location at Halley Park to the Journey Museum, had alterations done to its foundation to make the interior of the building more visible. These alterations were found to not meet the criteria of the National Register.

References 

Former National Register of Historic Places in South Dakota
Buildings and structures completed in 1876
Buildings and structures in Rapid City, South Dakota